The Georgia Mental Health Institute (GMHI) was a psychiatric hospital which operated from 1965 to 1997 near Emory University in Druid Hills near Atlanta, Georgia. It was located on the grounds of the Briarcliff Estate, the former residence of Asa G. Candler, Jr., the son of the founder of Coca-Cola.

History
Emory and the state of Georgia jointly developed the GMHI. Emory doctors provided some of the mental health services at GMHI, and some residents and fellows received part of their training in psychiatry there. Emory also had its own pediatric psychiatric outpatient programs based at the facility. The university also had 10 faculty scientists conducting 18 research studies at GMHI, focused on mental health, brain and central nervous system diseases. At its closing it had 141 beds and a $24.5 million budget. Due to rising costs, the Georgia Department of Human Resources proposed that the hospital close. They decided that they could send GMHI patients to other hospitals nearby and use the $24.5 million budget in other community mental health services.

After the institute closed, the 42 acre campus was purchased by Emory University from the state of Georgia for US$2.9 million. The university planned to turn the property into a biotechnology research and business development center. Unofficially the campus was referred to as "Emory West", and the university considered either renovating the existing 17 buildings or constructing new ones. Plans for the second campus were scaled back after faculty expressed a desire to remain at the main campus, but the university still planned to build the EmTech Bio Sciences Center as of 2000.

In film
The Netflix series "Stranger Things" used the Georgia Mental Health Institute as a filming location for the in-universe location "Hawkins National Laboratory".

References

External links
  Ben Miller, "Faded Treatment: The Georgia Mental Health Institute 10 Years After Closing", Reading On, Emory University
 "Emory considering possibilities if state closes mental health institute", Emory Report, Emory University, November 10, 1997
 "Neighborhood character: Becoming Briarcliff Campus", Emory Magazine, Emory University, Autumn 2011
 Photoset of tunnels

Emory University
Hospitals in Atlanta
Hospitals established in 1964
Psychiatric hospitals in Georgia (U.S. state)